Uson or Usón can refer to:

Places
 Uson, Masbate, a municipality in the Philippines
 Uson Island, an island in the municipality of Coron, Palawan, Philippines
 Usón, a village in the municipality of Huerto, Aragon, Spain

People
 Bobit Uson, member of the Filipino rock band AfterImage
 Chusé Raúl Usón (born 1966), a Spanish writer
 Francisco Usón, a Venezuelan general
 Marc Fernández Usón (born 1987), a Spanish basketball player
 Mocha Uson (born 1982), a Filipino singer, dancer, model, activist, and blogger

See also
 Usson (disambiguation)
 Uzon